"Dreamboat" is a popular song written by Jack Hoffman and recorded by Alma Cogan in 1955.

Dreamboat may also refer to:

Films
 Dreamboat (film), a 1952 comedy starring Clifton Webb

Music
Dreamboat, a 1975 album by George Baker Selection
"Dreamboat", a 1973 song by Limmie & the Family Cooking
"Dreamboat", a 1978 song by Elton John from Too Low for Zero
"Dreamboat", a 1979 song by John Mayall from Bottom Line
"Dreamboat", a 1993 song by The Crabs
"(He's My) Dreamboat", a 1961 song by Connie Francis